Abdul Wahab Zahiri (born May 27, 1992) is an Afghan sprinter. He competed in the men's 100 metres at the 2016 Summer Olympics, where he finished 7th in his heat in the preliminary round with a time of 11.56 seconds. He did not advance to round 1.

International competitions

Personal Bests

Outdoor

References

External links
 
 

Living people
1992 births
Afghan male sprinters
Olympic athletes of Afghanistan
Athletes (track and field) at the 2016 Summer Olympics
Athletes (track and field) at the 2018 Asian Games
Asian Games competitors for Afghanistan